Pius Font i Quer (Lleida 1888 – Barcelona 1964) was a Catalan botanist, pharmacist and chemist.

He organized the Institut Botànic de Barcelona and founded Jardí Botànic in this city. In 1911 he joined the Health Military Corporation,  in which he was given the military rank of tinent coronel farmacèutic. He was on a botanic expedition in Albarracín (Aragon) with his fellowship when the Francisco Franco's 1936 coup d'état failed and began the Spanish Civil War. When he want back to Barcelona, he had to go through the war front; for this the reason he was accused of being a member of the military rebellion and lost all his honours, which made continuation of his scientific work difficult.

He was president of the Institució Catalana d'Història Natural (1931–1934), president of the Institut d'Estudis Catalans in 1958 and of the Société Botanique at Geneve, honour vice president of the International Botany Congresses at Paris (1954) and Edinburgh (1964) and doctor honoris causa at the University of Montpellier.

Pius Font i Quer was the main creator of scientific botanical terminology  in Catalan and Spanish. His most well-known works are: Diccionario de Botánica (1953), which is the reference work for botany students in Spain; Plantas medicinales (1961); and Botánica pintoresca (1958). His research took place in Spain, but specially in Catalonia, southern Valencian Community and the Balearic Islands, mainly in Ibiza and Formentera.

Some species and subspecies have been named in honour of Font i Quer and bear the species epithet fontqueri.

References

External links 
 Font i Quer's Mycological Association in Spain
 Diccionario de Botánica, Ed. Labor, Barcelona (1953)

1888 births
1964 deaths
People from Lleida
20th-century Spanish botanists
Members of the Institute for Catalan Studies